Ethnology was an journal founded in 1962 by George Peter Murdock, published by the University of Pittsburgh. It was specialized in ethnographic articles and cross-cultural studies. It was discontinued in 2012.

The journal is published quarterly, and its online archive, available to subscribers, offers all 50 annual volumes published up to and including the end of 2011. Each issue is available in open access format 36 months after publication.

External links
 
 ANTHROPOLOGY JOURNALS - Ethnology. Introduction, Ethnology’s Intellectual Focus, Ethnology in Intellectual Space, and References

University of Pittsburgh
Publications established in 1962
Quarterly journals
Ethnology journals

References